UBI Business School, or UBI, (formerly known as United Business Institutes) is a private establishment of higher education located in Brussels, Luxembourg and Shanghai delivering BSc, MBA and DBA programmes in Business Studies and Administration. The school was founded as an asbl (non-profit organisation) in Brussels on 4 April, 1992 and all programmes are validated by Middlesex University in the United Kingdom.  Programmes at its European campuses are taught in English while the Shanghai campus programmes are taught in Mandarin Chinese.

Both the bachelor and MBA programmes were modernised in 2021 to follow three major axes: Globalisation, Digitalisation and Global Corporate Citizenship.

Following the consequences of COVID-19, UBI has adopted a combination of in-person, hybrid and online teaching across its campuses.

Campuses
UBI - Brussels is located in the very centre of the city, at 48 rue de Namur, close to the Central train station and within walking distance of the European Quarter, and the Luxembourg train station.

UBI - Luxembourg was opened in 2013 to operate a campus in Wiltz, Luxembourg. It is located in the Wiltz Castle.

UBI - China was opened in 2018 in the Yangpu District of Shanghai, China.

Programmes 
UBI offers the following degrees across its various campuses:

Accreditation 

The courses correspond to the British programme style of business studies. UBI awards degrees validated by Middlesex University in the United Kingdom.

UBI and Middlesex have signed a protocol of cooperation for the realisation of the programmes. Currently, students can study Bachelor, Master in Business Administration and Doctorate programmes on UBI's campuses. Middlesex University validates UBI's programmes and oversees their quality assurance measures.

See also 
 Middlesex University

References

External links 
Official website

1992 establishments in Belgium
Business schools in Belgium